Gail Robinson may refer to:

Gail Robinson (Neighbours), a fictional character on the Australian soap opera Neighbours
Gail Robinson (soprano) (1946–2008), American opera singer
Gail Robinson (writer), Canadian poet, novelist, and writer for radio